Krisztián Pogacsics (born 17 October 1985 in Zalaegerszeg) is a Hungarian Slovene football player who currently plays for Puskás Akadémia FC.

Club statistics

Updated to games played as of 27 June 2020.

External links

1985 births
Living people
People from Zalaegerszeg
Hungarian footballers
Association football goalkeepers
Zalaegerszegi TE players
FC Bihor Oradea players
Panionios F.C. players
AFC Săgeata Năvodari players
Győri ETO FC players
Puskás Akadémia FC players
Balmazújvárosi FC players
Kaposvári Rákóczi FC players
Nemzeti Bajnokság I players
Liga I players
Super League Greece players
Hungarian people of Slovenian descent
Hungarian expatriate footballers
Expatriate footballers in Romania
Expatriate footballers in Greece
Hungarian expatriate sportspeople in Romania
Hungarian expatriate sportspeople in Greece
Sportspeople from Zala County